Pelecotoma flavipes is a species of wedge-shaped beetle in the family Ripiphoridae. It is found in North America.

References

Further reading

 

Ripiphoridae
Articles created by Qbugbot
Beetles described in 1846